Online designer, also known as design-your-own designer, is a component of a website used to design, decorate, or customize a product such as t-shirt, stationary or other customizable products.

Commonly used in the decorated apparel industry, online designers were originally used by 'design your own' online fulfillments. Consumer editions allow any printer, embroiderer or customized goods producer to add an online designer to their own website.

An online designer typically allows a website user to:

 Select a product to decorate
 Select from stock art or clipart
 Upload their own unique design or photo
 Add custom text
 Add special effects such as drop shadows, glows, warping effects plus photo effects such as sepia, black and white and more.
 Purchase their customised product

Most online designer are built using Adobe Flash technology however lately products such as inkXE and DecoNetwork have been created designers using HTML and JavaScript due to the pressure applied on the market by non-flash supported devices such as Apple iPhone and iPad. InkSoft offers the most advanced online designer, built with HTML5.

Web development software